Col de Vizzavona  is a mountain pass at the centre of the French island of Corsica.

Location

Col de Vizzavona is located between the two major peaks on Corsica: the Monte d'Oro (altitude ), 3 km north-northwest, and the Monte Renoso, 6 km south-southeast. The pass, located in the Regional Natural Park of Corsica, is traversed by the RN193 road and connects the Vecchio Valley with the Gravona river and with the Gulf of Ajaccio.

Details of the climb
Over this distance, the road climbs  at an average gradient of 4.1%, although there are several downhill sections. The final  is at an average gradient of 6.5%; this was the route used in the Tour de France 2013.

From the south-west, the climb starts at the junction with the D29 road, close to the small village of Ucciani. The average gradient is 4.4%. En route, the road passes through the large village of Bocognano.

Tour de France
In June 2013, the Col de Vizzavona was crossed by the Tour de France, which passed through the island for the first time in the event's 100-year history.
Stage 2 of the race, between Bastia and Ajaccio, crossed the Col de Vizzavona. The climb was ranked Category 2 in the "King of the Mountains" competition, with Pierre Rolland being the first across the summit.

References

External links
Col de Vizzavona on "climbbybike" website
Le col de Vizzavona dans le Tour de France 

Mountain passes of Haute-Corse
Mountain passes of Corse-du-Sud